In physics, the fourth, fifth and sixth derivatives of position are defined as derivatives of the position vector with respect to time – with the first, second, and third derivatives being velocity, acceleration, and jerk, respectively. Unlike the first three derivatives, the higher-order derivatives are less common, thus their names are not as standardized, though the concept of a minimum snap trajectory has been used in robotics and is implemented in MATLAB.

The fourth derivative is often referred to as snap or jounce. The name "snap" for the fourth derivative led to crackle and pop for the fifth and sixth derivatives respectively, inspired by the Rice Krispies mascots Snap, Crackle, and Pop. These terms are occasionally used, though "sometimes somewhat facetiously".

(snap/jounce)
Snap, or jounce, is the fourth derivative of the position vector with respect to time, or the rate of change of the jerk with respect to time. Equivalently, it is the second derivative of acceleration or the third derivative of velocity,
and is defined by any of the following equivalent expressions:
In civil engineering, the design of railway tracks and roads involves the minimization of snap, particularly around bends with different radii of curvature. When snap is constant, the jerk changes linearly, allowing for a smooth increase in radial acceleration, and when, as is preferred, the snap is zero, the change in radial acceleration is linear. The minimization or elimination of snap is commonly done using a mathematical clothoid function.

The following equations are used for constant snap:

where

 is constant snap,
 is initial jerk,
 is final jerk,
 is initial acceleration,
 is final acceleration,
 is initial velocity,
 is final velocity,
 is initial position,
 is final position,
 is time between initial and final states.

The notation  (used by Visser) is not to be confused with the displacement vector commonly denoted similarly.

The dimensions of snap are distance per fourth power of time. In SI units, this is "metres per second to the fourth",  m/s4, m⋅s−4, or 100 gal per second squared in CGS units.

The fifth derivative of the position vector with respect to time is sometimes referred to as crackle. It is the rate of change of snap with respect to time. Crackle is defined by any of the following equivalent expressions:

The following equations are used for constant crackle:

where
 : constant crackle,
 : initial snap,
 : final snap,
 : initial jerk,
 : final jerk,
 : initial acceleration,
 : final acceleration,
 : initial velocity,
 : final velocity,
 : initial position,
 : final position,
 : time between initial and final states.

The dimensions of crackle are LT−5. In SI units, this is m/s5, and in CGS units, 100 gal per cubed second.

The sixth derivative of the position vector with respect to time is sometimes referred to as pop. It is the rate of change of crackle with respect to time.  Pop is defined by any of the following equivalent expressions:

The following equations are used for constant pop:

where
 : constant pop,
 : initial crackle,
 : final crackle,
 : initial snap,
 : final snap,
 : initial jerk,
 : final jerk,
 : initial acceleration,
 : final acceleration,
 : initial velocity,
 : final velocity,
 : initial position,
 : final position,
 : time between initial and final states.

The dimensions of pop are LT−6. In SI units, this is m/s6, and in CGS units, 100 gal per quartic second.

References

External links

 

Acceleration
Kinematic properties
Time in physics
Vector physical quantities